Arkansas Highway 237 (AR 237 and Hwy. 237) is a north–south state highway in Miller County. The route of  runs north from Highway 160 in the extreme southwest corner of the state along the east side of Texarkana to US 67.

Route description
The route runs north through the Sulphur River Wildlife Management Area to intersect I-49 south of Texarkana. Now entering the city, the route forms a brief concurrency with U.S. Route 71. The route now continues due north as Rondo Road to intersect Genoa Road and 9th Street. Now approaching the Texarkana Regional Airport, the route intersects Mandeville Road before terminating at Broad Street.

Major intersections

|-
| align=center colspan=3 |  concurrency south, 
|-

See also

 List of state highways in Arkansas

References

External links

237
Transportation in Miller County, Arkansas
Texarkana metropolitan area